Jacala, officially  Jacala de Ledezma  is a town and one of the 84 municipalities of Hidalgo, in central-eastern Mexico. The municipal seat lies at Jacala de Ledezma (municipality).  The municipality covers an area of 346.9 km².

As of 2005, the municipality had a total population of 12,057.

References

Municipalities of Hidalgo (state)
Populated places in Hidalgo (state)
Otomi settlements